Pokryváč is a village and municipality in Dolný Kubín District in the Žilina Region of northern Slovakia.

History
In historical records the village was first mentioned in 1593.

Geography
The municipality lies at an altitude of 640 metres and covers an area of 3.9 km2. It has a population of about 187 people

References

External links
  Pokryváč Village website photo gallery

Villages and municipalities in Dolný Kubín District